The Fujian pond turtle ("Mauremys" × iversoni) is a possibly also naturally occurring intergeneric hybrid turtle in the family Geoemydidae (formerly Bataguridae) produced in larger numbers by Chinese turtle farms as a "copy" of the golden coin turtle Cuora trifasciata. It appears to occur in China and Vietnam. Before its actual origin became known, it was listed as data deficient in the IUCN Red List.

The parents of this hybrid are the Asian yellow pond turtle and the golden coin turtle, with the male apparently usually of the latter species. While it is not unusual for perfectly valid geoemydid species to arise from hybridization, recognition as a species would require that the hybrids are fertile and constitute a phenotypically distinct and self-sustaining lineage. This does not appear to be the case in this "species" as only single specimens have been found rather than an entire population of these turtles and captive breeding has rarely been successful as most males proved to be infertile (while females are fully fertile).

The Fujian pond turtle's scientific name was given in dedication to American herpetologist John B. Iverson.

"Clemmys guangxiensis" is a composite taxon described from specimens of Mauremys mutica and the natural hybrid "Mauremys" × iversoni.

See also
 "Mauremys" × pritchardi
 "Ocadia" × glyphistoma
 Ocadia philippeni
 Cuora serrata

References

Footnotes

General sources

 
 
 

Reptiles of China
Mauremys
Taxonomy articles created by Polbot
Hybrid animals
Intergeneric hybrids